Marlon Bruno Mariano de Souza (born May 5, 1993 in Rio de Janeiro), known as just Marlon, is a Brazilian football left-back who currently plays for ABC Futebol Clube.

References

External links
  Ogol
  Soccerway

1993 births
Living people
Brazilian footballers
Sport Club Internacional players
Cruzeiro Esporte Clube players
Associação Ferroviária de Esportes players
Salgueiro Atlético Clube players
Santa Cruz Futebol Clube players
Figueirense FC players
Clube Atlético Tubarão players
Clube Atlético Bragantino players
Associação Atlética Portuguesa (Santos) players
ABC Futebol Clube players
Campeonato Brasileiro Série A players
Campeonato Brasileiro Série B players
Campeonato Brasileiro Série C players
Association football midfielders
Footballers from Rio de Janeiro (city)